Paul V. Jabour (born November 21, 1956) is a former American politician. He was a Democratic member of the Rhode Island Senate. Jabour served non-consecutively in the Rhode Island General Assembly from his special election in April 1985 until December 31, 1990 in the Rhode Island House of Representatives. Jabour was defeated in a three-way primary on September 12, 2018.

Early life
Jabour graduated from the University of Rhode Island. He earned his LLM from Boston University School of Law, and his JD from the University of New Hampshire School of Law.

Career
Jabour was challenged in the September 11, 2012 Democratic primary. He won with 1,656 votes (57.6%), and was unopposed for the November 6, 2012 General election, winning with 6,240 votes.
Jabour won a special election to the Rhode Island House of Representatives in April 1985 and was re-elected in 1986 and 1988.
When District 5 Democratic Senator Frank T. Caprio ran for state treasurer, Jabour won the three-way  2006 General election, beating Green candidate Jeffrey Toste and Republican nominee Robert Berrillo.
Jabour was unopposed in the 2008 election, winning with 5,155 votes.
Jabour was unopposed in the 2010 election, winning with 3,400 votes.
Paul Jabour's cousin Michael Solomon announced his candidacy for Mayor of Providence, Rhode Island.
Jabour was defeated in 2018 by Sam Bell in a three-way primary, 46% to 37%.

References

External links
Official page at the Rhode Island General Assembly

Paul Jabour at Ballotpedia
Paul V. Jabour at the National Institute on Money in State Politics

1956 births
Living people
American people of Lebanese descent
American politicians of Lebanese descent
Boston University School of Law alumni
Politicians from Providence, Rhode Island
Rhode Island lawyers
Democratic Party Rhode Island state senators
University of New Hampshire School of Law alumni
University of Rhode Island alumni
21st-century American politicians